Angiolo Tricca (17 February 1817 – 23 March 1884) was an Italian caricaturist and painter of historical themes. 

Born in Sansepolcro, he became a pupil of the painter Vincenzo Chialli. His best known works are the caricatures of Italian artists who attended the Caffè Michelangiolo in Florence (such as Collodi, Giovanni Fattori, Telemaco Signorini and Odoardo Borrani). He collaborated with making satirical cartoons, often pseudonymously, for journals published in Florence such as Il Piovano Arlotto, Il Lampione, and La Lanterna di Diogene. He also opened a gallery and antiquarian shop, where he often copied or repaired antique works.

One of his pupils was Federico Andreotti and his son, Fosco Tricca.

Sources
 Martina Alessio, Silvestra Bietoletti, Valentino Baldacci, Andrea Rauch, Attilio Brilli e Piero Scapecchi (a cura di). Angiolo Tricca e la caricatura toscana dell'Ottocento. Firenze, Giunti, 1993. .

1817 births
1884 deaths
19th-century Italian painters
Italian male painters
Painters from Tuscany
Italian caricaturists
People from Sansepolcro
19th-century Italian male artists